Bush sunflower is a common name for several plants and may refer to:

Encelia
Helianthus pumilus, native to the western United States